DDG may refer to:

IATA code for Dandong Langtou Airport, China
DuckDuckGo, an internet search engine
Dried distillers' grain, a cereal byproduct of the distillation process
Hull classification symbol for NATO guided-missile destroyers
Drop Dead, Gorgeous, a post-hardcore band
DDG (rapper) (born 1997), stage name of American musician Darryl Granberry Jr.
David de Gea (born 1990), Spanish goalkeeper
DDG Hansa, Deutsche Dampfschiffahrts-Gesellschaft Hansa, German Steamship Company Hansa
 Death Delay Glitch, a defect in the video game Oddworld: Abe's Oddysee which makes the character Abe invincible/invisible to enemies. The glitch also appears in Oddworld: New 'n' Tasty!